In mathematics, the KdV hierarchy is an infinite sequence of partial differential equations which starts with the Korteweg–de Vries equation.

Details
Let  be set of all analytic functions that satisfy , i.e. periodic functions of period 1. For each , define an operator

The KdV hierarchy is a sequence of nonlinear differential operators   such that for any  we have an analytic function   and we define  to be  and
,

The KdV hierarchy arises naturally as a statement of Huygens' principle for the D'Alembertian.

See also
Witten's conjecture
Huygens' principle

References

Sources

External links 
 KdV hierarchy at the Dispersive PDE Wiki.

Partial differential equations
Solitons
Exactly solvable models